Georgia Pritchett (born 1968) is a British producer, screenwriter, and author. She is best known for her work on Veep and Succession, as well as her book My Mess Is a Bit of a Life: Adventures in Anxiety. The Guardian described Pritchett as "one of the country’s most successful screenwriters".

Life and career
Pritchett was born in London in 1968, and raised in South London by her parents, Josephine Haworth, an author, and Oliver Pritchett, a journalist and columnist. Her brother Matt is a cartoonist, and her grandfather is writer and literary critic V. S. Pritchett. 

In an interview with The Hollywood Reporter, Pritchett cited American sitcoms as an early influence in her interest in writing, saying "I was one of those people who would like to watch things again and again, and learn huge chunks and recite them in what is [an] apparently quite irritating way. So I can kind of thought, I love dialogue and I would love to write dialogue and I like the collaborative [nature]." Additionally, Pritchett has cited Phoebe Waller-Bridge, Sharon Horgan, and Michaela Coel as women in the writing industry that she admires, stressing the gender imbalance in the television industry.

In 2021 Pritchett published her memoir, My Mess Is a Bit of a Life: Adventures in Anxiety, about her experiences in screenwriting as someone suffering anxiety.

Filmography

Awards 

Emmy Awards:
 2022 Emmy Award for Outstanding Drama Series for Succession
 2020 Emmy Award for Outstanding Drama Series for Succession
 2019 Emmy Award for Outstanding Comedy Series for Veep
 2017 Emmy Award for Outstanding Comedy Series for Veep
 2016 Emmy Award for Outstanding Comedy Series for Veep
 2015 Emmy Award for Outstanding Comedy Series for Veep
Writers Guild of America Awards:

 2014 Writers Guild of America Award for Television: Comedy Series for Veep
 2016 Writers Guild of America Award for Television: Comedy Series for Veep
 2018 Writers Guild of America Award for Television: Comedy Series for Veep
 2020 Writers Guild of America Award for Television: Dramatic Series for Succession
Writers' Guild of Great Britain Awards:

 2016 Best TV Situation Comedy for Veep

Publications 

 My Mess is a Bit of a Life: Adventures in Anxiety, 2021, HarperOne, ISBN 9780063206380

References

Living people
1968 births
English comedy writers
English screenwriters
British television writers